Sina Wall, (born 30 December 1989, in Munich) is a German former professional squash player who represented Germany in multiple European and World Team Championships. She reached a career-high world ranking of World No. 41 in December 2011. In 2011 she won the German Nationals and reached the final in 2008, 2009, 2010 and 2014. She is married to fellow German squash player Raphael Kandra.

References

External links 

1989 births
Living people
German female squash players
Competitors at the 2017 World Games
Sportspeople from Munich